Michael Geoffrey Hare Duke  (28 November 1924 – 15 December 2014) was an Anglican bishop and author: a former Bishop of St Andrews, Dunkeld and Dunblane.

Early life
Born 28 November 1924, he was educated at Bradfield College and Trinity College, Oxford.

He was a Sub-Lieutenant in the RNVR from 1944 to 1946.

Ordained ministry
Hare Duke was ordained deacon in 1952 and priest a year later. He began his ecclesiastical career as a curate at St John's Wood after which he was Vicar of St John with St Mark, Bury. He was Pastoral Director for the Clinical Theology Association after which he was Vicar of St Paul's, Daybrook.

He was elevated to the episcopate in 1969  as the 9th Bishop of St Andrews, Dunkeld and Dunblane. He retired in 1994.

He was a member of the Third Order of the Society of Saint Francis (TSSF), having made his profession in 1950.

Notes

1924 births
2014 deaths
People educated at Bradfield College
Alumni of Trinity College, Oxford
Bishops of Saint Andrews, Dunkeld and Dunblane
20th-century Scottish Episcopalian bishops